Survival Kit is the sixth studio album by American Atlanta-based hip hop group Goodie Mob. It was released on November 13, 2020. Production was handled by Organized Noize. It features guest appearances from Big Rube, André 3000, Big Boi, Chuck D and DC Young Fly.

Background
T-Mo stated that the reason Goodie Mob made the album Survival Kit was to respond the Black Lives Matter movement and the police brutality, saying, "Right now, just seeing all of our people on TV marching and protesting and being shot at, bottles and stuff being chucked at the police, people burning down buildings and looting because we’re tired of all of the injustices". Cee-Lo Green said that the group were "inclined by the opportunity and commanded by the circumstance … there's never a better time than the here and now to do something that you wanted to do. Something that you're able to do, and in that process, remind your audience and the industry, and the world at large that you are here for reason and purpose. Our purpose is not solely to entertain but to also convey that message, and make that connection with the people".

Track listing

Charts

References

2020 albums
Goodie Mob albums
Albums produced by Organized Noize